Beda was a Benedictine monk at the Northumbrian monastery of Saint Peter at Monkwearmouth.

Beda may also refer to:

Beda, Alabama
Beda (name)
Beda people, a community found in Jammu and Kashmir
Beda College, a college in Rome, Italy
Beda Fell, a fell in the English Lake District

See also
Löhner-Beda